Eupithecia classicata is a moth in the family Geometridae first described by Pearsall in 1909. It is found in the US state of Arizona and the Mexican state of Durango.

The wingspan is about 21–22 mm. The forewings are grayish brown with a prominent black discal spot and a diffuse paler area immediately beyond this spot. Adults are sexually dimorphic, with some degree of variation. Most females lack the antemedial diagonal black bar on the forewings which is found in the males. This is replaced by some thin striations. Adults have been recorded year round.

The larvae feed on Arbutus arizonica. They presumably feed on the flowers or leaf buds.

References

Moths described in 1909
classicata
Moths of North America
Moths of Central America